The von Neumann–Wigner interpretation, also described as "consciousness causes collapse", is an interpretation of quantum mechanics in which consciousness is postulated to be necessary for the completion of the process of quantum measurement.

Background: observation in quantum mechanics 

In the orthodox Copenhagen interpretation, quantum mechanics predicts only the probabilities for different observed experimental outcomes. What constitutes an observer or an observation is not directly specified by the theory, and the behavior of a system under measurement and observation is completely different from its usual behavior: the wavefunction that describes a system spreads out into an ever-larger superposition of different possible situations. However, during observation, the wavefunction describing the system collapses to one of several options. If there is no observation, this collapse does not occur, and none of the options ever becomes less likely.

It can be predicted using quantum mechanics, absent a collapse postulate, that an observer observing a quantum superposition will turn into a superposition of different observers seeing different things. The observer will have a wavefunction which describes all the possible outcomes. Still, in actual experience, an observer never senses a superposition, but always senses that one of the outcomes has occurred with certainty. This apparent conflict between a wavefunction description and classical experience is called the problem of observation (see Measurement problem).

The interpretation 

In his 1932 book The Mathematical Foundations of Quantum Mechanics, John von Neumann argued that the mathematics of quantum mechanics allows the collapse of the wave function to be placed at any position in the causal chain from the measurement device to the "subjective perception" of the human observer.  In 1939, Fritz London and Edmond Bauer argued for the latter boundary (consciousness).  In the 1960s, Eugene Wigner reformulated the "Schrödinger's cat" thought experiment as "Wigner's friend" and proposed that the consciousness of an observer is the demarcation line that precipitates collapse of the wave function, independent of any realist interpretation.  See Consciousness and measurement. The mind is postulated to be non-physical and the only true measurement apparatus.

This interpretation has been summarized thus:
The rules of quantum mechanics are correct but there is only one system which may be treated with quantum mechanics, namely the entire material world. There exist external observers which cannot be treated within quantum mechanics, namely human (and perhaps animal) minds, which perform measurements on the brain causing wave function collapse.

Henry Stapp has argued for the concept as follows:
From the point of view of the mathematics of quantum theory it makes no sense to treat a measuring device as intrinsically different from the collection of atomic constituents that make it up. A device is just another part of the physical universe...  Moreover, the conscious thoughts of a human observer ought to be causally connected most directly and immediately to what is happening in his brain, not to what is happening out at some measuring device...  Our bodies and brains thus become ... parts of the quantum mechanically described physical universe. Treating the entire physical universe in this unified way provides a conceptually simple and logically coherent theoretical foundation...

Objections to the interpretation 

There are other possible solutions to the "Wigner's friend" thought experiment, which do not require consciousness to be different from other physical processes.  Moreover, Wigner actually shifted to those interpretations (and away from "consciousness causes collapse") in his later years. This was partly because he was embarrassed that "consciousness causes collapse" can lead to a kind of solipsism, but also because he decided that he had been wrong to try to apply quantum physics at the scale of everyday life (specifically, he rejected his initial idea of treating macroscopic objects as isolated systems). See Consciousness and Superposition.

This interpretation relies upon an interactionist form of dualism that is inconsistent with the materialism that is commonly used to understand the brain, and accepted by most scientists.  (Materialism assumes that consciousness has no special role in relation to quantum mechanics.)  The measurement problem notwithstanding, they point to a causal closure of physics, suggesting a problem with how consciousness and matter might interact, reminiscent of objections to Descartes' substance dualism.

The interpretation has also been criticized for not explaining which things have sufficient consciousness to collapse the wave function. Also, it posits an important role for the conscious mind, and it has been questioned how this could be the case for the earlier universe, before consciousness had evolved or emerged.  It has been argued that "[consciousness causes collapse] does not allow sensible discussion of Big Bang cosmology or biological evolution". For example, Roger Penrose remarked: "[T]he evolution of conscious life on this planet is due to appropriate mutations having taken place at various times.  These, presumably, are quantum events, so they would exist only in linearly superposed form until they finally led to the evolution of a conscious being—whose very existence depends on all the right mutations having 'actually' taken place!"  Others further suppose a universal mind (see also panpsychism and panexperientialism).  Other researchers have expressed similar objections to the introduction of any subjective element in the collapse of the wavefunction.

Testability 

All interpretations of quantum mechanics are empirically indistinguishable, as they all predict the same outcomes to quantum mechanical experiments.  It has been argued that the results of delayed-choice quantum eraser experiments empirically falsify this interpretation.  However, the argument was shown to be invalid because an interference pattern would only be visible after post-measurement detections were correlated through use of a coincidence counter; if that wasn't true, the experiment would allow signaling into the past.  The delayed-choice quantum eraser experiment has also been used to argue for support of this interpretation, but, as with other arguments, none of the cited references proves or falsifies this interpretation.

Reception 

A poll was conducted at a quantum mechanics conference in 2011 using 33 participants (including physicists, mathematicians, and philosophers). Researchers found that 6% of participants (2 of the 33) indicated that they believed the observer "plays a distinguished physical role (e.g., wave-function collapse by consciousness)". This poll also states that 55% (18 of the 33) indicated that they believed the observer "plays a fundamental role in the application of the formalism but plays no distinguished physical role". They also mention that "Popular accounts have sometimes suggested that the Copenhagen interpretation attributes such a role to consciousness. In our view, this is to misunderstand the Copenhagen interpretation."

Views of the pioneers of quantum mechanics 

Many of the originators of quantum mechanical theory held that humans can effectively interrogate nature through interacting with it, and that in this regard quantum mechanics is not different from classical mechanics.  In addition, Werner Heisenberg maintained that wave function collapse, "The discontinuous change in the probability function", takes place when the result of a measurement is registered in the mind of an observer. However, this is because he understood the probability function as an artifact of human knowledge: he also argued that the reality of the material transition from "possible" to "actual" was mind-independent.  Albert Einstein, who believed in realism, and did not accept the theoretical completeness of quantum mechanics, similarly appealed for the merely epistemic conception of the wave function:

[I advocate] that one conceives of the psi-function [i.e., wavefunction] only as an incomplete description of a real state of affairs, where the incompleteness of the description is forced by the fact that observation of the state is only able to grasp part of the real factual situation. Then one can at least escape the singular conception that observation (conceived as an act of consciousness) influences the real physical state of things; the change in the psi-function through observation then does not correspond essentially to the change in a real matter of fact but rather to the alteration in our knowledge of this matter of fact.

Bohr also took an active interest in the philosophical implications of quantum theories such as his complementarity principle. He believed quantum theory offers a complete description of nature, albeit one that is simply ill-suited for everyday experiences - which are better described by classical mechanics and probability. Bohr never specified a demarcation line above which objects cease to be quantum and become classical. He believed that it was not a question of physics, but one of philosophy or convenience.

See also
 Interpretations of quantum mechanics
 Measurement in quantum mechanics
 Quantum mind
 Quantum Zeno effect
 Wigner's friend

References

External links
PHYSICS TODAY: "Is the moon there when nobody looks? Reality and the quantum theory"  (pdf)
"Quantum Cosmology and the Hard Problem of the Conscious Brain" (pdf)
Mindful Sensationalism: A Quantum Framework for Consciousness.
Brian Josephson on QM and consciousness
Quantum Enigma from Oxford University Press
"Critique of Quantum Enigma Physics encounters Consciousness", by Michael Nauenberg

Consciousness
Interpretations of quantum mechanics
Observation
Philosophical problems
Philosophy of physics
John von Neumann